SVB Securities is an investment bank, specializing in healthcare and technology. SVB Securities was founded in 1995 by Jeffrey A. Leerink, and is headquartered in Boston, with offices in New York City, San Francisco, and Charlotte.

History

SVB Securities was founded in 1995 as Leerink Swann LLC. The following year, the bank established MEDACorp expert network as a joint venture with Dr. Dan Dubin. It acted as a strategic knowledge resource at SVB Leerink, using validation of new products and commercial viability in the assessment of company financials, and corporate due diligence in the medial field as part of a merger and acquistion advisory or capital raising.

In 1999, Inc. named the bank as the magazine's America's 500 fastest growing private companies.

A 2010 probe into expert network focused on potential for conflict of interest and insider dealings through expert network across the entire industry. The U.S. Securities and Exchange Commission (SEC) investigated a 2009 merger between Cougar Biotech and Johnson & Johnson in which Leerink advised Cougar. MedaTech client SAC Capital had been an investor in Cougar Biotech. The focus of the investigation was whether any information about the transaction flowed from Leerink via MedaTech to SAC. According to Leerink, the firm operated strict information barriers. Speculations about MedaTech's shut down as part of the investigation proved unfounded.

In 2012, the SEC charged a former Leerink analyst for insider trading. The analyst had obtained confidential information about a merger transaction Leerink was working on and passed this information on to a friend to place trades on his behalf. The analyst gained around $600,000 from this investment and was later sentenced for insider trading.

In 2014, Leerink Swann was rebranded as Leerink Partners LLC, which by 2019, was called SVB Leerink, and was acquired by SVB Financial Group.

In 2022, SVB acquired media and telecom research company MoffettNathanson. Further, SVB Leerink was rebranded as SVB Securities LLC.

Following the collapse of Silicon Valley Bank in March 2023, the management of SVB Securities planned to buy back their firm from the parent group.

On March 17, 2023, SVB Securities' parent company filed for Chapter 11 bankruptcy.

References

Investment banks in the United States
Banks based in Massachusetts
Companies based in Boston
Companies that filed for Chapter 11 bankruptcy in 2023
Financial services companies established in 1995
Banks established in 1995
2019 mergers and acquisitions
American corporate subsidiaries